Madeleine Suffel (1899–1974) was a French film and stage actress. She played supporting roles in a number of films from the early 1930s onwards.

Selected filmography
 A Rare Bird (1935)
 School for Coquettes (1935)
 Good Luck (1935)
 Counsel for Romance (1936)
 Under Western Eyes (1936)
 Taras Bulba (1936)
 Gibraltar (1938)
 The Train for Venice (1938)
 Tricoche and Cacolet (1938)
 Whirlwind of Paris (1939)
 Miquette (1940)
 Monsieur Hector (1940)
 Serenade (1940)
 The Stairs Without End (1943)
 Monsieur des Lourdines (1943)
 Goodbye Leonard (1943)
 My First Love (1945)
 The Last Metro (1945)
 Roger la Honte (1946)
 The Murderer is Not Guilty (1946)
 Les Amants du pont Saint-Jean (1947)
 Naughty Martine (1947)
 Love Around the House (1947)
 The Unknown Singer (1947)
 Miquette (1950)
 The Atomic Monsieur Placido (1950)
 Good Lord Without Confession (1953)
 The Porter from Maxim's (1953)
 Les Diaboliques (1955)
 Love in Jamaica (1957)
 Charming Boys (1957)
 The Bureaucrats (1959)
 The Bread Peddler (1963)

References

Bibliography
 Barrot, Olivier & Chirat, Raymond. Noir et blanc: 250 acteurs du cinéma français, 1930-1960. Flammarion, 2000.
 Goble, Alan. The Complete Index to Literary Sources in Film. Walter de Gruyter, 1999.
 Palmer, Tim &  Michael, Charlie. Directory of World Cinema: France. Intellect Books, 2013.

External links

1899 births
1974 deaths
French film actresses
French stage actresses
Actresses from Paris
20th-century French actresses